Boolaroo Subgroup is a geologic formation in the Lachlan Orogen in eastern Australia in the Hunter Region. Formed in the late Permian, it is part of the Newcastle Coal Measures. This formation includes sandstone, conglomerate, tuff, and black coal. Belmont Conglomerate Member, part of the Boolaroo Subgroup can be seen at Caves Beach, New South Wales.

See also 
 Lachlan Orogen
 Newcastle Coal Measures
 Reids Mistake Formation
 Sydney Basin

References 

Geologic formations of Australia
Permian Australia
Sandstone formations
Geology of New South Wales